Zernsdorf is a village in Dahme-Spreewald, Brandenburg, Germany.  Since 2003 it has been part of the city of Königs Wusterhausen.  The population is approximately 4,500.

Geography

Zernsdorf is situated south-east of Berlin, on the banks of three lakes.  The largest of these is the Krüpelsee, which is fed by the Dahme; the other two are the Lankensee and the Ukleisee.  The main part of Königs Wusterhausen lies about 5km to the west; the state capital, Potsdam, is about 40km to the north-west.

Administrative status

From 1965 to 2003 Zernsdorf was divided into three administrative districts: Zernsdorf, Uklei and Kablow-Ziegelei.

References 

Villages in Brandenburg
Localities in Dahme-Spreewald